The Amersfoort and Utrecht witch trials took place in Amersfoort in The Netherlands in 1591–1595, with appeals and sentences in Utrecht.  The witch trials resulted in the prosecution of seventeen people and the execution of at least six people by strangulation and burning. It was arguably the biggest witch trials conducted by the Dutch Republic, which conducted less witch trials than most states in Europe.

References 

 H.A. Hauer: in Breevoort can ick vergeten niet Uitgever: De Graafschap, 1956

Witch trials in the Netherlands
1595 in law
1590s in the Dutch Republic
16th-century executions